Adrian Alvarado (born April 18, 1976) is an American actor and writer of Puerto Rican decent. He is best known for his roles on the soap opera General Hospital Marvels The Punisher, Law & Order SVU, Blue Bloods, FBI and Power.

Roles
 Body of Proof (2012) - "Hunting Party".
Sleepless Nights (2002)
Strong Medicine
General Hospital (Det. Cruz Rodriguez: 2005- 2008)
Cry of the Winged Serpent (2006)
Urban Decay (2007)
Big Love  (2010)
The Punisher (2019)

External links

American male soap opera actors
1976 births
Living people